Kanikanum Neram is a 1987 Indian Malayalam-language film, directed by Rajasenan and produced by Augustine Prakash. The film stars Sunitha, Nedumudi Venu, Ratheesh and Saritha. The film has musical score by S. P. Venkatesh and songs composed by  A. T. Ummer.

Cast
Sunitha as Indu
Nedumudi Venu as Sethu
Ratheesh as Raghu
Saritha as Savithri
Vineeth as Vinu
Sadiq as Nandhu
Vincent as Balagopalan
KPAC Sunny as Parambil Keshavan
Oduvil Unnikrishnan as Mathukutty
Aranmula Ponnamma as Muthassi
Alex Mathew as Shivan
Jose Prakash as Parameshwan Menon 
Mafia Sasi as Gunda

Soundtrack
The music was composed by A. T. Ummer and the lyrics were written by P. Bhaskaran.

References

External links
 

1987 films
1980s Malayalam-language films
Films directed by Rajasenan